The Astronomical Journal (often abbreviated AJ in scientific papers and references) is a peer-reviewed monthly scientific journal owned by the American Astronomical Society (AAS) and currently published by IOP Publishing. It is one of the premier journals for astronomy in the world.

Until 2008, the journal was published by the University of Chicago Press on behalf of the AAS. The reasons for the change to the IOP were given by the society as the desire of the University of Chicago Press to revise its financial arrangement and their plans to change from the particular software that had been developed in-house. The other two publications of the society, the Astrophysical Journal and its supplement series, followed in January 2009.

The journal was established in 1849 by Benjamin A. Gould. It ceased publication in 1861 due to the American Civil War, but resumed in 1885. Between 1909 and 1941 the journal was edited in Albany, New York. In 1941, editor Benjamin Boss arranged to transfer responsibility for the journal to the AAS.

The first electronic edition of The Astronomical Journal was published in January, 1998. With the July, 2006 issue, The Astronomical Journal began e-first publication, an electronic version of the journal released independently of the hardcopy issues.

As of 2016 all of the scientific AAS journals were placed under a single editor-in-chief. On January 1, 2022, the AAS Journals, including AJ, transitioned to Gold open access model, with all new papers released under a Creative Commons Attribution license and access restrictions and subscription charges removed from previously published papers.

Editors
 2016–present  Ethan Vishniac
 2005–2015      John Gallagher III
 1984–2004      Paul W. Hodge
 1980–1983      Norman H. Baker
 1975–1979      Norman H. Baker and Leon B. Lucy
 1967–1974      Lodewijk Woltjer (with Baker and Lucy for later volumes)
 1966–1967      Gerald Maurice Clemence
 1965–1966      Dirk Brouwer and Gerald Maurice Clemence
 1963–1965      Dirk Brouwer
 1959–1963      Dirk Brouwer and Harlan James Smith
 1941–1959      Dirk Brouwer
 1912–1941      Benjamin Boss
 1909–1912      Lewis Boss
 1896–1909      Seth Carlo Chandler
 1885–1896      Benjamin A. Gould, Jr.
 1849–1861      Benjamin A. Gould, Jr.

See also
 The Astronomical Almanac
 The Astrophysical Journal

References

External links
 Official website
 Dudley Observatory, The Astronomical Journal
 Scanned issues (1849-1997) from ADS

Astronomy journals
Publications established in 1849
Monthly journals
English-language journals
IOP Publishing academic journals
American Astronomical Society academic journals
1849 establishments in the United States
Delayed open access journals